The Diocese of Stockholm is a division of the Church of Sweden. Its cathedral is Storkyrkan in Stockholm's Old Town. The diocese covers most of metropolitan Stockholm and was formed in 1942 from parts of the medieval dioceses of Strängnäs and Uppsala, both of which pre-dated the foundation of the city. Before 1942, the City of Stockholm itself and Greater Stockholm were divided more or less equally between the two medieval dioceses at Slussen just south of Stockholm's Old Town.

List of bishops
The current bishop of Stockholm is Andreas Holmberg, who was ordained on 5 March 2019. The following have served as Bishop of Stockholm since the diocese was established in 1942:
Manfred Björkquist (1942–1954)
Helge Ljungberg (1954–1971)
Ingmar Ström (1971–1979)
Lars Carlzon (1979–1984)
Krister Stendahl (1984–1988)
Henrik Svenungsson (1988–1998)
Caroline Krook (1998–2009)
Eva Brunne (2009–2019)
Andreas Holmberg (2019–present)

Kontrakts
The diocese comprises the following 13 kontrakts, the equivalent of a deanery within the Church of Sweden:
Domkyrkokontraktet
Södermalms Kontrakt
Brännkyrka Kontrakt
Birka Kontrakt
Roslags Kontrakt
Värmdö Kontrakt
Södertörns Kontrakt
Östermalms-Lidingö Kontrakt
Enskede Kontrakt
Spånga Kontrakt
Sollentuna Kontrakt
Solna Kontrakt
Huddinge-Botkyrka Kontrakt

References

 
Stockholm
1942 establishments in Sweden
Christian organizations established in 1942